A lava coil is a spiral or scroll-shaped lava formation occurring when relatively low viscosity lava such as Pahoehoe solidifies along a slow-moving shear zone in the flow. The shear produces a Kelvin–Helmholtz instability that forms spiral-shaped patterns. Depending on the side of the flow the spiral is clockwise or anti-clockwise. They have been observed on flows near Kilauea on Hawai'i, in Kenya and possibly on Mars.

References

Volcanology
Igneous rocks